Elias "Edo" Spier (26 May 1926 – 6 September 2022) was a Dutch architect and politician. A member of the Democrats 66 party, he served in the Senate from 1991 to 1995.

Spier died on 6 September 2022, at the age of 96.

References

 

1926 births
2022 deaths
Members of the Senate (Netherlands)
20th-century Dutch architects
20th-century Dutch politicians
Politicians from Amsterdam